Tarryall is an unincorporated town of cabins and old buildings in eastern Park County, Colorado, United States.  The town is located on Tarryall Creek in the eastern edge of the South Park, between Lake George and Jefferson.

History
The town was founded in 1896 as Puma City, in response to mineral discoveries in the area.  Within its first year, it reached a peak population of about a thousand residents.  The Tarryall Post Office soon opened to serve the town.  The population dwindled as the mineral discoveries proved to be much smaller than first thought.  In the 1900s, the town took the name of its post office, Tarryall.  Only a handful of residents remain.

References

External links
 Photo gallery
 GhostTowns.com:  Tarryall (Puma City)

Colorado Mining Boom
Populated places in Park County, Colorado